The Catholic University of Portugal (Portuguese: Universidade Católica Portuguesa, pronounced [univɨɾsiˈðad(ɨ) kɐˈtɔlikɐ puɾtuˈɣezɐ]), also referred to as Católica or UCP for short, is a concordat university (non-state-run university with concordat status) headquartered in Lisbon and with four locations: Lisbon, Braga, Porto and Viseu. Besides the four centres in Portugal, UCP also has the University of Saint Joseph in Macau as its affiliate.

It is recognized as the best Portuguese university according to the Times Higher Education World University Rankings, with more than 19 000 students. The current and 6th Rector of UCP is Professor Isabel Capeloa Gil.

Católica in Figures 

Students: 11 970 students (Degree-Granting Programmes); 7 549 postgraduate students (non degree-granting programmes).

Faculty: 1 024 faculty members; 231 international faculty members.

Degrees awarded: 41 950 undergraduate; 17 045 masters; 919 doctoral.

Study Cycles: 35 Undergraduate; 66 Masters; 25 Doctoral.

Research: 15 research units; 1 183 researchers; 8 479 scientific publications; 59 patents.

Internationalisation: 1 740 international students; 763 mobility protocols; 94 student nationalities.

Grants and awards: 2 708 Grants and prizes awarded; €€ 6.383,663 in merit-based grants, social support and awards.

Teaching units: 17 basic teaching units, three of them with extensions in several UCP locations.

 Católica Lisbon School of Business Economics (Lisbon)
 Faculty of Humanities (Lisbon)
 Faculty of Law (Lisbon, Porto)
 Faculty of Dental Medicine (Viseu);
 Faculty of Theology (Lisbon, Porto, Braga)
 Institute of Health Sciences (Lisbon, Porto)
 Institute of Political Studies (Lisbon)
 Higher Institute of Canon Law (Lisbon)
 Católica Porto Business School (Porto)
 School of Arts (Porto)
 School of Biotechnology (Porto)
 Faculty of Education and Psychology (Porto)
 Institute of Bioethics (Porto)
 Faculty of Philosophy and Social Sciences (Braga)
 Department of Economics, Management and Social Sciences (Viseu)
 Católica Medical School (Sintra)
Católica Doctoral School

Source:

History 
Universidade Católica Portuguesa, founded in 1967 by decree of the Holy See, is a Higher Education Institution based on the core values of humanism, with an international vocation, with a view to promoting qualified education and integral formation, knowledge and research of reference, and innovation at the service of the common good. These are some of Católica's historical landmarks:

1967: Universidade Católica Portuguesa is established by decree of the Holy See (Lusitanorum Nobilissima Gens), at the request of the Portuguese Bishops' conference and under Concordat Law.

1968: the University is extended to Lisbon where it opens the Faculty of Theology.

1971: Católica is officially recognized by the Portuguese government in 1971, by decree-law 307/71, which acknowledges Universidade Católica as on a par with the other Portuguese universities.

1972: Establishment of the Faculty of Human Sciences in Lisbon, at Palma de Cima campus.

1973: Creation of the first Programme in Management in Portugal, the undergraduate degree in Business Sciences, later called Management and Business Administration.

1978: Católica is extended to Porto.

1980: Católica is extended to Viseu.

1984: Establishment of the Faculty of Biotechnology, a pioneer school in Portugal.

1996: Creation of the Inter-university Institute of Macau (presently the University of St Joseph in Macau).

1999: Creation of Braga Regional Centre.

2006: Incorporation into the Institute of Health Sciences of Schools of Nursing based in Porto and Lisbon. Later it was named Católica School of Nursing.

2008: Católica Lisbon School of Business & Economics becomes the first Portuguese Business School to hold the Triple Crown status. It is considered the Best Business School by the Financial Times.

2017: Católica celebrates its 50th anniversary.

2018: The Portuguese President awards UCP as an Honorary Member of the Order of Public Instruction.

2019: 1st time Best University in Portugal by the THE.

2020: Accreditation of the Integrated Master in Medicine. 2nd time Best University in Portugal by the THE.

2021: Católica celebrates its 55th anniversary.

Rankings
According to the Times Higher Education World University Rankings, the Catholic University of Portugal is recognized as the #1 University in Portugal, among 14 Portuguese Higher Education institutions .

Teaching units 
The Catholic University of Portugal is a national university composed by the Headquarters in Lisbon and three regional centres in Porto, Braga and Viseu, each one including several schools, faculties, institutes and departments.

Lisbon (headquarters) 

In Lisbon, operate the following faculties and institutes:

Católica Lisbon School of Business & Economics 

Founded in 1989, the Católica Lisbon School of Business and Economics is one of the best Business Schools in Portugal.

The School is recognized for its excellence, being the first Business School in Portugal to be accredited by the Triple Crown, as well as the only Affiliated School in Portugal of the Chartered Financial Analyst® (CFA) Program, and also with Executive Education programmes ranked by the Financial Times among the 50 best in the world.

The school offers undergraduate degrees in Management, Economics, international undergraduate in Management and international undergraduate in Economics; masters of science taught entirely in English, in Management, Economics, Finance, Management with specialization in Strategic Marketing, Management with specialization in Strategy & Entrepreneurship, and in Business. CATÓLICA-LISBON also has executive masters programmes in Finance, Management with a specialization in Leadership Development, Management with a specialization in Strategic Marketing, Management with a specialization in Digital Innovation and Management with a specialization in Finance and Control. The school also offers executive programmes, related to Management, Finance, Innovation, Healthcare Management, among others.

CATÓLICA-LISBON also has a Master's in Business Administration program, which is a joint-venture between Catholic University of Portugal and Universidade Nova de Lisboa. The partnership includes a full-time one year degree, in partnership with MIT Sloan School of Management and a part-time degree. The two universities that offer this program hold accreditation, from the Association for MBAs, the European Foundation for Management Development and the Association to Advance Collegiate Schools of Business.

CATÓLICA-LISBON has a research unit entitled Católica Lisbon Research Unit in Business and Economics.

Faculty of Human Sciences

Founded in 1972, the Faculty of Human Sciences offers programmes focused on communication sciences, social sciences, culture studies, philosophy and psychology. The faculty went through a restructuring process in 1991, after the establishing of the Faculties of Law and of Economics and Business Sciences, implementing new degree programmes. Throughout the years, the Faculty has been acknowledged by Eduniversal, which annually evaluates thousands of programmes in 30 fields of knowledge, prepares the ranking based on the reputation of the courses, the level of employability and the degree of student satisfaction.

The faculty offers undergraduate programmes in social and cultural communication studies, applied foreign languages, social work, psychology and philosophy – B-Learning and it has the first undergraduate course in Philosophy, Politics and Economics in Portugal; master's degrees in communication studies, culture studies, psychology in business and economics, education sciences, family studies, Asian studies, philosophy, psychology of wellbeing and health promotion, social work, translation, linguistics for teachers of English as a foreign language, Portuguese Sign Language Teaching - b-learning, and Portuguese as a foreign language/second language; doctoral degrees in communication studies, international doctoral program in culture studies, translation studies, history, psychology: emotions and wellbeing and social work; as well as a variety of post-graduate and advanced training programmes.

The Faculty of Human Sciences integrates four research centres: Research Centre for Communication and Culture, Research Centre for Philosophy, Research Centre for Portuguese Speaking Peoples and Cultures, and Católica Research Centre for Psychological, Family and Social Wellbeing.

Lisbon School of Law

The Católica | Lisbon School of Law was founded in 1989, although the first undergraduate degree in Law from Catholic University of Portugal took place in 1976, as part of the Faculty of Human Sciences.

The Católica | Lisbon School of Law offers an undergraduate degree in Law; Master's programmes in Master of Laws – Administrative Law, Master of Law & Business, Master of Laws – Corporate Law, Master of Laws – Taxation, Master of Laws – Litigation, and Master of Transnational Law; LL.M. Law in a European and Global Context, Law in a Digital Economy, and in International Business Law; Ph.D. Programme in Law and Global Ph.D. Programme; and Post-Graduate programmes and Intensive and Short Courses.

Throughout the years, a couple of programmes have been distinguished by Eduniversal and Financial Times.

The Católica | Lisbon School of Law has a research unit of generalist scope, entitled Católica Research Centre for the Future of Law, created in 2012.

Faculty of Theology

The Faculty of Theology was founded in 1968. Apart from being established in Lisbon, the School also operates in Braga and Porto since 1987.

The Faculty of Theology offers an undergraduate program in Religious Sciences, a master's degree in Religious Studies, an Integrated Master in Theology, a master's degree in Religious Sciences, a Doctorate in Theology, a Post-Doctorate program, non-awarding degree courses and Distance Learning programmes.

The Faculty of Theology has two research units: Research Centre for Theology and Religious Studies (CITER) and Centre of Religious History Studies.

Higher Institute of Canonical Law

Founded in 2004, the Institute of Higher Canon Law was canonically erected by the Holy See as an Institute , representing a teaching and research unit. The Institute follows the previous Centre for the Study of Canon Law (CEDC), created in 1989.

The Institute for Higher Canon Law offers a program that deepens the study of Canon Law, in which a Diploma in Canon Law can be obtained.

Institute of Political Studies

The Institute for Political Studies (IEP) was founded in 1997. It is the only Portuguese academic institute that integrates the association EUROPAEUM, a group of leading universities from Europe.

The Institute provides its students with an undergraduate program in Political Science and International Relations; master's degrees in Political Science and International Relations: Security and Defense, Political Science: Governance and International Relations (Mozambique), Governance, Leadership and Democracy Studies; Double Degrees in European Studies and Governance, Leadership and Democracy Studies in partnership with Jagiellonian University – Poland, and in International Studies and Governance, Leadership and Democracy Studies in partnership with Pázmány Péter Catholic University – Hungary; a doctoral degree in Political Science and International Relations: Security and Defense; a Post-Graduate program and Advanced Training programmes.

IEP has two research units: Centre for European Studies, led by Professor José Manuel Durão Barroso (Former President of the European Commission from 2004 to 2014), and Research Centre of the Institute for Political Studies, which is an R&D unit funded by the FCT – Science and Technology Foundation.

Institute of Health Sciences

Founded in 2004, the Institute of Health Sciences functions at a national level, with presence in Lisbon and Porto. The institute is composed by the Católica School of Nursing, one in each city.

The Institute of Health Sciences in Lisbon offers an undergraduate degree in Nursing; master's degrees in Nursing, Portuguese Sign Language Teaching, Portuguese Sign Language and Education for the Deaf, Neuropsychology, Cognitive and Behavioral Neurosciences, and in Palliative Care; and Doctoral programmes in Nursing, and Cognition and Language Sciences.

Católica Medical School 
The Integrated Master in Medicine at Universidade Católica received accreditation by the Agency for Assessment and Accreditation of Higher Education (A3ES) in October 2020.

Católica Medical School intends to develop an inspiring and innovative teaching of medicine, which prepares health professionals of excellence, with a deep ethical sense and high social responsibility, able to contribute to the continuous improvement of health care and inspired by the mission of working for the common good, in a commitment to the patient.

In line with this, it focuses on three strategic lines:

 The use of student-centred teaching methodologies ("Problem based-Learning") to guarantee the transmission of knowledge and the most advanced medical and scientific techniques, placing students at the centre of their learning and empowering them with autonomy to make decisions about their academic and professional path.
 Training in clinical skills from the first year of the degree and the organisation of semi-professional clinical internships, with the participation of students as fully integrated members of medical teams.
 The inclusion of research, both laboratory and clinical, in the curriculum of the medical degree, therefore stimulating education in the scientific method and facilitating the training of clinician-scientists.

Teaching of excellence will be guaranteed by four fundamental pillars:

 The inclusion in Universidade Católica Portuguesa, an institution with important experience in the health area and highly regarded nationally and internationally for its excellence in teaching and research.
 The partnership with Maastricht University, one of Europe's leading universities, which occupies a top place among the best Young Universities, and with a Medicine curriculum, which will be adapted and implemented in our School, which has proven quality and effectiveness.
 The partnership with Luz Health Group, one of the largest private healthcare groups in Portugal. The clinical practice in its hospitals, recognized through the accreditation of Hospital da Luz Lisboa by the Joint Commission International (JCI), guarantees the quality of clinical teaching. Hospital da Luz Lisboa has all the variety of medical and surgical specialties, equipment, laboratories and clinical research required of a university hospital. Added to this is its tradition in the teaching area - Hospital da Luz Learning Health - with the experience and notoriety acquired in Training, Research and Innovation.
 A faculty team formed by professors recognised and distinguished either by their practice of medicine, as teachers, or in the area of research.

The School will be located on the Sintra campus of the UCP, next to Tagus Park, and the building is being fully refurbished, including the creation of new spaces such as the interactive library, the anatomy lab, the skills lab and the scientific lab.

Porto Regional Centre 
In 1978, the Catholic University of Portugal extended to Porto, with the creation of the Propaedeutic Year of the Law Course, but it was only in 1983 that the Regional Nucleus of Porto was created, which since 1994 has been called Regional Centre.

The Foz Campus is located next to Foz Velha and includes seven teaching units. It consists of the Arts Building, the Central Building, the Américo Amorim Building, the Paraíso Building and the Restoration Building.

The Porto Regional Centre of Universidade Católica Portuguesa is composed by the following teaching units:

Católica Porto Business School

Católica Porto Business School was founded in 1987, starting to teach Management as an extension of the Faculty of Human Sciences (FCH) based in Lisbon. In 1996, the School also became responsible for teaching Economics in Porto, as an extension of the Faculty of Economics and Business Sciences (currently the Católica Lisbon School of Business & Economics), in Lisbon.

In 2001, the Faculty of Economics and Management of the UCP was created in Porto. A year later, the Católica Porto Business School (at the time called EGE - Atlantic Business School), in partnership with important business associations and other universities, began to encompass all the activity of Executive Education.

Today, the Católica Porto Business School has a wide range of programmes consisting of a degree programme in Economics and Management and a double degree in Law and Management, as well as Master's programmes in Auditing and Taxation, Business Economics, Finance, Management, Human Resources Management and Marketing. Within the scope of Executive Training, Católica Porto Business School has MBAs, executive courses, sectorial and customized Post-Graduations and also Abroad Training.

In addition to the formative offer, Católica Porto Business School develops a structured research activity through multiple Centres and Laboratories: CEGE - Research Centre in Management and Economics; two applied research laboratories, LEAD.lab, a leading knowledge centre, and SLab - Service Management Lab - a competence centre of Católica Porto Business School of the Catholic University of Portugal, which aims to produce and transfer knowledge that can contribute to increase the productivity, quality and innovation of industries and service-related tasks.

Católica Porto Business School also has consulting services available through CEGEA - Centro de Estudos de Gestão e Economia Aplicada (Centre for Management and Applied Economics Studies).

Faculty of Biotechnology
The School of Biotechnology (ESB) started its activity as an institute of higher education in 1984.

Currently, ESB offers three degree courses in Bioengineering, Microbiology and Nutrition Sciences; four master's courses in Food Engineering, Biomedical Engineering, Applied Microbiology, Biotechnology and Innovation, European Master in Food Science, Technology and Business; doctoral programmes in Biotechnology, in Science, Food Technology and Nutrition. The School also has several Post-Graduate programmes.

In parallel with its academic activity, ESB has created and developed a research centre, Centre for Biotechnology and Fine Chemistry (CBQF) which, since 2004, has the status of a laboratory associated with the State and develops activities in the area of Biotechnology, specifically in the Food and Environmental areas and its relationship with quality of life and well-being. One of the capabilities of CBQF is to provide scientific services to the community and different industries.

Faculty of Education and Psychology

Founded in April 2007, by decision of the Grand Chancellor D. José da Cruz Policarpo, the existence of the Faculty of Education and Psychology dates back to 1997, when the Institute of Education (IEDU) was created.

Currently it offers a degree in Psychology and master's degrees in Educational Sciences, in Psychology, and in Psychology and Human Resources Development. In terms of doctorates, it offers a doctoral programme in Educational Sciences, whose first edition took place in 2007-2008 and extended, in a national context, to editions in Viseu and Lisbon and, in an international context, to Mozambique. Since 2019, it also offers a PhD Program in Applied Psychology - Adaptation and Change in Contemporary Societies, a joint degree with two European Higher Education Institutions (IES) - Universitat Ramon Lluli and Nottingham Trent University. This programme contributes to the development of relevant research in the field of Psychology and enables future PhD graduates to receive high quality training in an international context. This 3rd Cycle training offer in Psychology is the first in Portugal, both inter-university and international. The Faculty also promotes a number of postgraduate courses.

The research activity is part of the Research Centre for Human Development (CEDH). Formally created in 2013, although it has been the research aggregator of the Faculty since 2008, it takes a broad and multidimensional look at human development, covering all the stages of the life cycle, considering and analysing the various transitions that guide the paths of life. It has human and material resources and infrastructures, such as the Human Neurobehavioral Laboratory (HNL).

The action of the FEP also includes the provision of services to the community through: the University Clinic of Psychology, which constitutes a support structure for the activity in the area of Psychology; the Support Service for the Improvement of Education (SAME) which aims to promote the improvement of the quality of the processes and educational results of Portuguese schools; the Community Service which allows the students of the degree in Psychology to develop voluntary work.

Faculty of Law - School of Porto

The Católica Porto Law School was distinguished for having created the first law degree in the history of Porto and the North of the country, in 1978. Later, it was again a pioneer in becoming the first Law School to implement the Bologna Declaration, in 2003, and the first to launch a Double Degree (in Law and Management), in 2015.

It currently offers a law degree (daytime and post-time course) and a double degree in law and management, in partnership with the Católica Porto Business School. In terms of 2nd cycle, it offers two masters: in Law (General or with the possibility of choosing one of the specializations) and in Law and Management. In terms of 3rd cycle, it offers a PhD in Law. The Faculty has the International Law Program, available to undergraduate students, and promotes the attendance of academic mobility programmes at universities around the world. In addition to the degree courses, more than a dozen postgraduate courses are also offered, some in association with other entities.

The new research demands have led to the creation of the Católica Research Centre for the Future of Law (CEID), a generalist legal research unit that aims to promote a profound change in the legal research paradigm in Portugal. CEID obtained the classification of "Very Good" in the last two evaluations carried out by FCT, which places it among the best ranked law research centres in Portugal.

Faculty of Theology

The Faculty of Theology was founded in 1968. In addition to being present in Lisbon, the Faculty operates in Braga and Porto since 1987.

In 1989 the opening of the Degree Course in Religious Sciences took place at the Porto Regional Centre.

Today, the Faculty of Theology of the Porto Regional Centre offers a degree programme in Religious Sciences; Master's degrees in Religious Studies, in Religious Sciences and integrated master's degree in Theology; Doctorate in Theology; Continuing Education.

The Faculty of Theology has two research units: Centre for the Study of Religious History and Centre for Research in Theology and Religious Studies (CITER).

Institute of Bioethics

The Institute of Bioethics (IB) was created by the Higher Council of the Catholic University of Portugal, in July 2002, with the commitment to extend and adapt the work of the Bioethics Research Office (GIB) to new developments in science and technology.

With the objective of establishing a multidisciplinary approach to the complex challenges of today's society and attentive to the advances and ethical contours of progress, the IB develops a wide field of activities, assuming two major pillars of action: Training and Research.

In terms of training, the IB has a PhD program in bioethics and advanced training in bioethics.

In the field of research, the IB develops multiple projects at the international level.

Institute of Health Sciences

The Institute of Health Sciences of the Catholic University of Portugal was created in Lisbon on 20 January 2004, with the purpose of coordinating the areas of knowledge that incorporate issues of Biomedicine and Health. Subsequently, the ICS was extended to Porto and integrated the health courses already in operation at the Escola Superior de Biotecnologia: degree and master in Nursing; degree in Health Technologies (Pharmacy and Clinical Analysis) and the master's degree in HIV/AIDS. 

In 2006, within the scope of the ICS, the Escola Superior Politécnico de Saúde was created, which included the Escola Superior de Enfermagem da Imaculada Conceição (in operation since 1935) and the Escola Superior de Enfermagem de São Vicente de Paulo (in operation since 1937), which became respectively the Unidade de Ensino de Enfermagem do Porto and the Unidade de Ensino de Enfermagem de Lisboa. In addition to the degree in Nursing, this school also offered a course in Health Technologies, which had already been discontinued. On 30 September 2015, the Higher Council of the University approved the change of name from Polytechnic School of Health to Nursing School, maintaining two units: Nursing School (Regional Centre of Porto) and Nursing School (Lisbon Headquarters).

The Institute of Health Sciences at the Porto Regional Centre offers a degree in Nursing; Master's programmes in Nursing, Advanced Nursing and in Gerontology and Geriatric Care; and a PhD programme in Nursing. The ICS at the Porto Regional Centre also offers Postgraduate Studies, Advanced Training and Continuous Training.

School of Arts

Founded in 1996, the School of Arts of Catholic University of Portugal is based in the city of Porto.

Currently the School of Arts of the Porto Regional Centre offers degrees dedicated to Conservation and Restoration, Cinema, and Sound and Image; master's degrees in Cinema, Sound and Image, Conservation and Restoration of Cultural Assets, Photography, Management of Creative Industries, Music Education; and doctorates dedicated to Science, Technology and Art, Conservation and Restoration of Cultural Assets, and Heritage Studies.

The School of Arts also offers Post-Graduate programmes in Curatorship, Study and Documentation of Contemporary Art, and Sacred Music, as well as free courses in various areas.

The School of Arts has three research centres: Digital Creativity Centre, Centre for Conservation and Restoration, and Centre for Research and Technology of Arts.

Braga Regional Centre 
The Braga Regional Centre of the Catholic University of Portugal integrates the buildings of the Camões Campus (owned by the UCP), the Praça da Faculdade (owned by Companhia de Jesus), and Rua de Santa Margarida (owned by the archdiocese of Braga). The Camões Campus, located on Rua de Camões, comprises the buildings of the Central Services of the Regional Centre, the School Services and facilities for the teaching service of the Faculties, as well as the parking lot and the Miradouro do Sagrado Coração de Jesus (Braga's tourist point).

The Braga Regional Centre is composed by the following Faculties:

Faculty of Philosophy and Social Sciences

Founded on June 1, 2015, the Faculty of Philosophy and Social Sciences is a continuation of the Faculty of Philosophy, founded by the Society of Jesus in 1947, and of the more recent Faculty of Social Sciences, created in Braga in 2001.

The Faculty of Philosophy and Social Sciences maintains the existing courses in the two faculties that originated it, these being the degrees in Philosophy, Social Service, Psychology, Communication Sciences, Tourism, Portuguese and Spanish Studies, ICT, Design and Visual Arts and Sciences of Artistic and Cultural Heritage; masters in Philosophy, Literature, Psychology, Tourism, Communication, Teaching Portuguese and Spanish, Teaching of Visual Arts, Heritage, Gerontology and Educational Sciences.

Faculty of Theology

In 1977, the Congregation for Catholic Education (Holy See) granted the Instituto Teológico de Braga (Seminário Conciliar) the status of a Higher Education School affiliated to the Faculty of Theology (Lisbon) of the Catholic University of Portugal, with the capacity to confer to its students the academic bachelor's degree by that Faculty. From 1 October 1987 the Instituto Superior de Teologia was transformed into an integral part of the Faculty of Theology of the Catholic University of Portugal. Together with the Porto Regional Centre and the UCP Headquarters in Lisbon, it constitutes the Faculty of Theology.

Viseu Regional Centre 
It has computer centres, translation-interpretation rooms, study and research laboratories, a multimedia room with videoconference facilities, auditoriums, a library and a university dental clinic.

The Viseu Regional Centre of Universidade Católica Portuguesa is composed by the following teaching units:

Faculty of Dental Medicine

Previously known as the Institute of Health Sciences, in 2019 it became the Faculty of Dental Medicine. It offers an undergraduate program in biomedical sciences, an integrated master's degree in dental medicine, a master in applied biomedicine, a specialization in oral surgery, and a post-graduate course in clinical periodontology.

Institute of Management and Health Organisations

Founded in 2019, the Institute of Management and Health Organisations is the result of a change in the name of the former Department of Economics, Management and Social Sciences, the latter being created in 2006.

The Institute of Management and Health Organisations offers an undergraduate program in management, as well as a master's degree in management; post-graduate courses in quantitative and qualitative data analysis, psychological assessment in the field of SEN, social gerontology, family conflict management, management of social incubators, social innovation, models of psychosocial intervention in children, youth and families, sustainable entrepreneurship, quality management in the third sector, service management, and management of social organizations; and advanced training in psychological assessment and reporting, volunteer management, management of small health units, and management control, accounting and taxation.

Research units 
Catholic University of Portugal hosts 15 research centres among its faculties and institutes, that focus in the fields of arts and technologies, education and psychology, philosophy, biotechnology and chemistry, health sciences, political science, business and economics, history, social sciences, communication and culture, law, theology and religious studies:

 Centre for Biotechnology and Fine Chemistry
 Católica Lisbon Research Unit in Business and Economics
 Research Centre for Communication and Culture
 Centre for Interdisciplinary Research in Health
 Research Centre for Science and Technology of the Arts
 Research Centre in Management and Economics
 Research Centre for Human Development
 Centre of Religious History Studies
 Research Centre for Theology and Religious Studies
 Centre for Philosophical and Humanistic Studies
 Research Centre of the Institute for Political Studies
 Católica Research Centre for the Future of Law
 Research Centre for Psychological Family and Social Wellbeing
 Research Centre for Portuguese Speaking Peoples and Cultures
 Católica Biomedical Research Centre

Rectors

2016–present - Professor Isabel Capeloa Gil
2012–2016 - Professor Maria da Glória Ferreira Pinto Dias Garcia
2000–2012 - Professor Manuel António Garcia Braga da Cruz
2000–1996 - Professor Manuel Isidro Araújo Alves
1996–1988 - Professor D. José da Cruz Policarpo
1988–1972 - Professor José do Patrocínio Bacelar e Oliveira

Notable people

Faculty 

 Aníbal António Cavaco Silva
 Diogo Pinto de Freitas do Amaral
 José João de Freitas Barbosa Pereira Coutinho
 José Manuel Durão Barroso
 José Tolentino Calaça de Mendonça
 Marcelo Nuno Duarte Rebelo de Sousa
 Maria Alves da Silva
 Maria do Rosário Lopes Amaro da Costa
 Roberto Artur da Luz Carneiro

Alumni 
 António Horta Osório
 António Luís dos Santos da Costa
 D. Manuel Clemente
 Isabel Jonet
 Paulo de Sacadura Cabral Portas
 Ricardo Araújo Pereira
 Sérgio Rebelo
 Vítor Louçã Rabaça Gaspar

See also 

List of universities in Portugal
Universidade Católica Portuguesa

References

External links
 

 
Education in Lisbon
Catholic universities and colleges in Portugal
Educational institutions established in 1967
Education in Porto
Braga
1967 establishments in Portugal